"Still" is a song by American singer Macy Gray from her debut studio album, On How Life Is (1999). It was released as the album's third single in the United Kingdom on March 13, 2000, and in the United States on September 26, 2000. The song details a troubled relationship between a woman and a man who is abusive towards her.

"Still" became Gray's second consecutive top-40 single on the UK Singles Chart, peaking at number 18. In the United States, while failing to enter the Billboard Hot 100, the single reached number 22 on the Adult Top 40 chart at number 32. Elsewhere, the song reached number eight in New Zealand and number 21 in Australia.

"Still" was released on two CD formats in the UK and featured remixes of both "Still" and "I Try" along with a live version of the latter.

Track listings

 UK CD1
 "Still" (album version) – 4:15
 "Still" (X-Ecutioner's remix) – 4:16
 "I Try" (Jo Whiley Radio 1 Session) – 4:15
 "Still" (video) – 4:06

 UK CD2
 "Still" (album version) – 4:15
 "Still" (Attica Blues mix) – 7:13
 "I Try" (Grand Style mix) – 4:57

 UK cassette single
 "Still" (album version) – 4:15
 "I Try" (Grand Style mix) – 4:57

 European CD1
 "Still" (album version) – 4:15
 "I Try" (Jo Whiley Radio 1 Session) – 4:15

 European CD2
 "Still" (album version) – 4:15
 "Still" (X-Ecutioner's remix) – 4:16
 "Still" (Attica Blues mix) – 7:13
 "I Try" (Jo Whiley Radio 1 Session) – 4:15

 Australian CD1
 "Still" – 4:15
 "Still" (X-Ecutioner's remix) – 4:16
 "Still" (Attica Blues mix) – 7:13
 "I Try" (Grand Style mix) – 4:57
 "I Try" (Jo Whiley Radio 1 Session) – 4:15

 Australian CD2
 "Still" – 4:15
 "I Try" – 3:59
 "I Try" (Grand Style mix) – 4:57

Credits and personnel
Credits are lifted from the On How Life Is album booklet.

Studios
 Recorded and mixed at Paramount Studios, Sunset Sound, and A&M Studios (Hollywood, California)

Personnel

 Macy Gray – lyrics
 Jeremy Ruzumna – music, piano
 Bill Esses – music
 Jeff Blue – music
 Dawn Beckman – back-up vocals
 Musiic Galloway – back-up vocals
 Sy Smith – back-up vocals
 Jay Joyce – guitars
 Arik Marshall – guitars
 Greg Richling – bass
 Patrick Warren – Chamberlin
 Matt Chamberlain – drums
 Lenny Castro – percussion
 Jon Brion – vibes
 David Campbell – string arrangements
 Andrew Slater – production
 Dave Way – recording, mixing

Charts

Weekly charts

Year-end charts

Certifications

Release history

References

1990s ballads
1999 songs
2000 singles
Epic Records singles
Macy Gray songs
Music videos directed by Jonas Åkerlund
Songs about domestic violence
Songs written by Jeremy Ruzumna
Songs written by Macy Gray